The Pegazair-100 STOL is a two-seat STOL homebuilt aircraft developed in Canada by Tapanee Aviation, Inc. of Mont-Saint-Michel, Quebec.

Development

Development of the Pegazair started in 1985 by Serg Dufour of Mont-Saint-Michel, Quebec. Originally it consisted of a new set of Pega-STOL wings with retractable leading edge slats to be installed on Zenair CH 701 STOLs to replace their wings which have fixed leading edge slots. Dufour went on to develop a new fuselage and tail to match the wings. The Pegazair is a two seats in side-by-side configuration, strut-braced, high-wing monoplane with conventional landing gear. Fuselage construction is welded steel tubing with aluminum skin. The wings employ full length flaperons and leading edge slats that deploy automatically. The tailplane is slotted for slow speed authority. The prototype was outfitted with a  Continental A-65 engine.

The design was later developed into the four-seat Tapanee Levitation 4.

Variants

Pegazair P80
Powered by an  Rotax 912UL
Pegazair P100
Powered by an  Continental O-200 or  Rotax 914

Specifications (Pegazair-100 STOL)

See also

References

External links

 Manufacturers web site

Homebuilt aircraft
Tapanee Aviation aircraft
High-wing aircraft
Single-engined tractor aircraft
Aircraft first flown in 1991